An Officer and a Gentleman is a 1982 American romantic drama film starring Richard Gere, Debra Winger, and Louis Gossett Jr. Gossett  won the Academy Award for Best Supporting Actor for the film, making him the first black male to do so. It tells the story of Zack Mayo (Gere), a United States Navy Aviation Officer Candidate who is beginning his training at Aviation Officer Candidate School. While Zack meets his first true girlfriend during his training, a young "townie" named Paula (Winger), he also comes into conflict with the hard-driving Marine Corps Gunnery Sergeant Emil Foley (Gossett) training his class.

The film was written by Douglas Day Stewart and directed by Taylor Hackford. Its title is an old expression from the Royal Navy and later from the U.S. Uniform Code of Military Justice's charge of "conduct unbecoming an Officer and a Gentleman" (from 1860). The film was commercially released in the U.S. on August 13, 1982. It was well received by critics, with a number calling it the best film of 1982. It also was a financial success, grossing $190 million against a budget that was between $6-$7 million.

Plot
After his mother's suicide, adolescent Zachary "Zack" Mayo was sent to live with his alcoholic womanizing father, Byron, a U.S. Navy petty officer stationed in the Philippines. Now an adult, Zack prepares to report to Fort Rainer, the (fictional) U.S. Navy's Aviation Officer Candidate School (AOCS), located near Port Townsend, Washington. Zach surprises Byron by announcing his intention to become a Navy jet pilot.

Upon arrival at AOCS, Zack and his fellow recruits meet Marine Gunnery Sergeant Emil Foley, their stern, no-nonsense drill instructor. Foley says any OCs that are mentally or physically unfit to be a U.S. Navy officer will be dismissed. Male candidates are also warned about "Puget Sound Debs", local girls aspiring to marry a Naval Aviator and who will use pregnancy to entrap an officer. Soon after, Zack and fellow candidate, Sid Worley, meet two young factory workers, Paula Pokrifki and Lynette Pomeroy, at a Navy dance. Zack begins a relationship with Paula, while Sid dates Lynette.

Loner Zack is caught peddling illegally-obtained naval uniform accessories to cash-strapped candidates so they can pass inspections. Foley tells Zack he lacks integrity, motivation, and is not a team player. He punishes Zack with a weekend of rigorous hazing to force his resignation. When Zack refuses to quit, Foley outright dismisses him from the program. Zack breaks down emotionally and admits he has no options in civilian life. Believing Zack has reached a crucial self-realization point in his life, Foley relents. Zack is assigned to cleaning work, but he does so to atone for his behavior.

At dinner with Paula's family, her mother appears infatuated with Zack while her step-father acts hostile. Zack learns that Paula's absent biological father was an officer candidate who abandoned Paula's mother when she became pregnant. As it nears time to transfer to another base for the next training phase, Zack ends his and Paula's relationship, which she reluctantly accepts.

During the final obstacle-course run, as Zack is about break the base's course record, he stops to encourage his teammate, Casey Seeger, to complete the run so she can graduate. Zack dines with Sid and his parents and learns that, after Sid is commissioned, he is expected to marry his late brother's fiancé. Meanwhile, Lynette tells Sid she may be pregnant.

After a severe anxiety attack during a high-altitude simulation in a pressure chamber, Sid quits the program. He goes to Lynette's house and proposes marriage, saying he never wanted a military career and was only assuming his deceased brother's role to please his family. He intends to move back to Oklahoma and resume his old JC Penney's job. A stunned Lynnette rejects him, saying she wants to marry a naval aviator and travel the world, then admits she is not pregnant. A dejected Sid leaves. Soon after, Zack and Paula arrive looking for Sid; Lynette recaps what happened and Zack accuses her of faking being pregnant, which she denies.

Zack and Paula find Sid at a motel where he has committed suicide. Zack, blaming himself, heads back to the base, intending to quit. He angrily confronts Foley, who refuses Zack's resignation and challenges him to settle their differences in a martial arts combat. Zack lands several blows on a surprised Foley before the latter incapacitates Zack; he says it is Zack's choice to quit.

Zack completes his training and is commissioned as an officer; following tradition, he and the other graduates receive their first salute from Foley. Zack thanks Foley for not giving up on him.

Zack goes to Paula's workplace and carries her out in his arms to everyone's applause, including Lynette.

Cast 
(in credits order)

Production

Locations 

The film was shot in late 1981 on the Olympic Peninsula of Washington, at Port Townsend and Fort Worden.  The U.S. Navy did not permit filming at NAS Pensacola in the  Florida panhandle, the site of the actual Aviation Officer Candidate School in 1981.  Deactivated U.S. Army base Fort Worden stood in for the location of the school, an actual Naval Air Station in the Puget Sound area, NAS Whidbey Island.

A motel room in Port Townsend, The Tides Inn on Water Street, was used for the film. There was a plaque outside the room noting it as a filming location, although the room has been extensively refurbished. Some early scenes of the movie were filmed in Bremerton, with ships of the Puget Sound Naval Shipyard in the background.

The "Dilbert Dunker" scenes were filmed in the swimming pool at what is now Mountain View Elementary School (Port Townsend Jr High School during filming).  According to the director's commentary on the DVD, the dunking machine was constructed specifically for the film and was an exact duplicate of the actual one used by the Navy.  , Mountain View Elementary is closed and is home to the Mountain View Commons, which holds the police station, food bank, and the YMCA, the latter of which holds the pool.

The filming location of Paula Pokrifiki's house was 1003 Tremont in Port Townsend.  As of 2009, the house was shrouded by a large hedge, and the front porch had been remodeled.  The neighboring homes and landscape look identical to their appearance in the film, including the 'crooked oak tree' across the street from the Pokrifiki home.  This oak tree is visible in the scene near the end of the film in which Richard Gere returns to the home to request Paula's help in finding his friend Sid.  In the film, the plot has Paula leaving on a ferry ride away from the naval base.  In reality, Paula's home is located approximately 8 blocks from Fort Worden.

Lynette Pomeroy's house was located on Mill Road, just west of the main entrance of the Port Townsend Paper Corp. mill. The house no longer exists, but the concrete driveway pad is still visible.

The interior of the USO building at Fort Worden State Park was used for the reception scene near the beginning of the film.

The concrete structure used during the famous Richard Gere line "I got nowhere else to go!" is the Battery Kinzie located at Fort Worden State Park.  The scene was filmed on the southwest corner of the upper level of the battery.  The 'obstacle course' was constructed specifically for the film and was located in the grassy areas just south and southeast of Battery Kinzie.

It can be seen through the windows of the building's basement.

Building 204 of Fort Worden State Park was used as the dormitory and its porch was used for the film's closing 'silver dollar' scene.

The filming location for the exterior of 'TJ's Restaurant' is located at the Point Hudson Marina in Port Townsend. The space is now occupied by a company that makes sails. The fictional "TJ's" is an homage to the Trader Jon's bar in Pensacola, Florida, as a naval aviator hangout until it closed later in November 2003. For years, it was traditional for graduating Aviation Officer Candidate School classes to celebrate their commissioning at "Trader's."

Casting 
Originally, folk music singer and occasional actor John Denver was signed to play Zack Mayo. But a casting process eventually involved Jeff Bridges, Harry Hamlin, Christopher Reeve, John Travolta, and Richard Gere. Gere eventually beat all the other actors for the part. Travolta had turned down the role, as he did with American Gigolo (another Richard Gere hit).

The role of Paula was originally given to Sigourney Weaver, then to Anjelica Huston and later to Jennifer Jason Leigh, who dropped out to do the film Fast Times at Ridgemont High instead.  Eventually, Debra Winger replaced Leigh for the role of Paula. Rebecca De Mornay, Meg Ryan, and Geena Davis auditioned for the role of Paula.

In spite of the strong on-screen chemistry between Gere and Winger, the actors did not get along during filming.  Publicly, she called him a "brick wall" while he admitted there was "tension" between them. Thirty years later, Gere was complimentary towards Winger when he said that she was much more open to the camera than he was, and he appreciated the fact that she presented him with an award at the Rome Film Festival.

R. Lee Ermey was originally the main cast for Gunnery Sgt. Emil Foley due to his time of being an actual drill instructor for the United States Marine Corps at Marine Corps Recruit Depot San Diego in the 1960s. However, Taylor Hackford instead cast Louis Gossett Jr. and had Ermey coach him for his role as the film's technical advisor. It was there where the "steers and queers" comment from Gossett's character in the 1982 movie came from, which was later used for Ermey's role in the 1987 film Full Metal Jacket.

Hackford kept Gossett Jr. in separate living quarters from other actors during production so Gossett could intimidate them more during his scenes as drill instructor. In addition to R. Lee Ermey, Gossett was advised by Gunnery Sergeant Buck Welscher, an actual drill instructor at Aviation Officer Candidate School, NAS Pensacola. He can be seen leading the senior class after the run.

Props 
Richard Gere rides a 750cc T140E Triumph Bonneville. Paramount purchased two of the motorcycle from Dewey's Cycle Shop in Seattle. The stunt bike is on display in the Planet Hollywood restaurant, Orlando, Florida. In the United Kingdom, Paramount linked with Triumph Motorcycles (Meriden) Ltd on a mutual promotion campaign. Triumph's then-chairman, John Rosamond, in his book Save The Triumph Bonneville! (Veloce 2009), states it was agreed cinemas showing the film would be promoted at their local Triumph dealer, and T140E Triumph Bonnevilles supplied by the dealer would be displayed in the cinema's foyers.

Ending 
Richard Gere balked at shooting the ending of the film, in which Zack arrives at Paula's factory wearing his naval dress whites and carries her off the factory floor. Gere thought the ending would not work because it was too sentimental. Director Taylor Hackford agreed with Gere until, during a rehearsal, the extras playing the workers began to cheer and cry. When Gere saw the scene later, with a portion of the score (that was used to write "Up Where We Belong") played at the right tempo, he said it gave him chills. Gere is now convinced Hackford made the right decision. Screenwriter Michael Hauge, in his book Writing Screenplays That Sell, echoed this opinion: "I don't believe that those who criticized this Cinderella-style ending were paying very close attention to who exactly is rescuing whom."

Release 
Two versions of the film exist. The original, an uncensored R-rated cut and an edited-for-broadcast television cut (which first aired on NBC in 1986) are nearly identical. The main difference is that the nudity and a majority of the foul language are edited out when the film airs on regular television.  However, the group marching song near the beginning of the film and Mayo's solo marching song are not voiceover edits; they are reshoots of those scenes for television.  Also, the sex scene between Mayo and Paula is cut in half, and the scene where Mayo finds Sid's naked body hanging in the shower is also edited.

Home media
The film has been available on various formats, first on VHS and also DVD. It was first released on DVD in 2000 with two extra features, audio commentary and film trailer. It was released as a collectors edition in 2007 with new bonus material. The film debuted on Blu-ray in the U.S. by Warner Bros. and UK by Paramount Pictures in 2013, however the same bonus features ported from the 2007 DVD are only on the U.S. release. It was re-released in 2017 by Paramount Pictures.

Reception

Box office 
An Officer and a Gentleman was an enormous box office success and went on to become the third-highest-grossing film of 1982, after E.T.: The Extra Terrestrial and Tootsie. It grossed $3,304,679 in its opening weekend and $129,795,554 overall at the US and Canadian box office. It sold an estimated 44 million tickets in the US and Canada. Internationally, it grossed $60 million for a worldwide gross of $190 million.

Critical response 
An Officer and a Gentleman was well received by critics and is widely considered one of the best films of 1982. The film holds a 79% rating on the review aggregation website Rotten Tomatoes, based on 33 reviews, with the consensus: "Old-fashioned without sacrificing its characters to simplicity, An Officer and a Gentleman successfully walks the fine line between sweeping romance and melodrama". On Metacritic it has a score of 75% based on reviews from 8 critics.
It received rave reviews from critics, most notably from Roger Ebert, who gave it four out of four stars. Ebert described An Officer and a Gentleman as "a wonderful movie precisely because it's so willing to deal with matters of the heart...it takes chances, takes the time to know and develop its characters, and by the time this movie's wonderful last scene comes along, we know exactly what's happening, and why, and it makes us very happy."
 
Rex Reed gave a glowing review where he commented: "This movie will make you feel ten feet tall!" British film critic Mark Kermode, an admirer of Taylor Hackford observed, "It's a much tougher film than people remember it being; it's not a romantic movie, it's actually a movie about blue-collar, down-trodden people."

Accolades 
The film is recognized by American Film Institute in these lists:
 2002: AFI's 100 Years...100 Passions—#29
 2004: AFI's 100 Years...100 Songs:
 "Up Where We Belong"—#75
 2006: AFI's 100 Years...100 Cheers—#68

Louis Gossett Jr. became the first African-American actor to win the Academy Award for Best Supporting Actor and the fourth African-American Oscar winner overall (after Hattie McDaniel, Sidney Poitier and Isaac Hayes).

Producer Don Simpson complained about the song "Up Where We Belong", "The song is no good. It isn't a hit," and unsuccessfully demanded it be cut from the film. It later became the number one song on the Billboard charts.

Soundtrack

Track Listing (Original Record)

Charts

Adaptations 
 The Takarazuka Revue adapted the movie as a musical in 2010 in Japan (Takarazuka Grand Theater; Tokyo Takarazuka Theater). The production was performed by Star Troupe and the cast included Reon Yuzuki as Zack Mayo, Nene Yumesaki as Paula Pokrifki and Kaname Ouki as Gunnery Sergeant Emil Foley.
 A stage musical, with book by Douglas Day Stewart and Sharleen Cooper Cohen and songs by Ken Hirsch and Robin Lerner, directed by Simon Phillips, opened on May 18, 2012, at the Lyric Theatre in Sydney, Australia. The production received mixed reviews and closed after six weeks.
 In 1990 the American TV show The Simpsons adapted the iconic final scene of the film in the 9th episode of the first season, "Life on the Fast Lane". The gender roles are swapped as Marge plays the role of Gere, finding Homer's Winger in the nuclear power plant, after fears on infidelity in their marriage are swept away as Marge is carried away by Homer in the exact fashion as the movie. The tribute to this film has become just as iconic to the point many Simpsons fans don't realise it is a homage
 In 1992 the American sitcom Clarissa Explains It All  parodies the final scene in season 3's first episode "Janet's Old Boyfriend." Main character Clarissa imagines her mother being swept away like Debra Winger in the film by her visiting old high school boyfriend Joey Russo as Richard Gere.

See also 
 Conduct unbecoming an officer and a gentleman

References

External links 

 
 
 
 

1980s English-language films
1982 films
1982 romantic drama films
American romantic drama films
Fictional couples
Films about the United States Marine Corps
Films about the United States Navy
Films about the working class
Films scored by Jack Nitzsche
Films directed by Taylor Hackford
Films featuring a Best Supporting Actor Academy Award-winning performance
Films featuring a Best Supporting Actor Golden Globe winning performance
Films set in Seattle
Films set in Washington (state)
Films set in the Philippines
Films shot in Washington (state)
Films shot in the Philippines
Films that won the Best Original Song Academy Award
Films with screenplays by Douglas Day Stewart
Paramount Pictures films
1980s American films